Cerovo (earlier ,) is a village and municipality in the Krupina District of the Banská Bystrica Region of Slovakia.

History 
The village was first mentioned as Chery in a charter in 1273, its name is derived from the Old Slavic "cěrъ"/Slovak "cer"/Hungarian "cser" (the Hungarian word is derived from the Slavic one), which means Turkey oak. It had Slovak inhabitants.

Scarce ruins of the old Litava castle can be found south-west of Cerovo on the northern end of the Pustý hrad mountain. The Litava Castle was built by Hunt or his son, Big Derž (Derš, Hungarian: Ders) from the Hunt-Poznan family. The castle was first mentioned in 1276. In this year the grandchildren of Lambert, of the Hunt-Poznan family, Small Derž (Ders) and Demeter captured Litava and robbed valuables of 3000 marks and charters. Therefore, the king confiscated their property and gave their property to Big Derž from the Hunt-Poznan family. Before 1307 Nicholas Túri Kövér, son of Big Derž of the Hunt-Poznan family, exchanged the castle Litava with his relatives, Derž and Demeter of Hunt. In 1318 master Tomáš, son of Derž of the Hunt-Poznan family, protested against the occupation of Litava by Matthew III Csák. The castle perished not long after, probably during struggles of the oligarchs.

But a new castle was built 3 kilometres north-west of the old Litava castle. It was called Litava too until the middle of the 15th century when the new castle would be called Čabraď (also called Litava, Haradnuk, Haradnok, Chabrad, Chabragh, Lytva, Hradnok, Haradna, Castrum ad Litavan etc.). In 1342 the king debarred the new castle together with the old ruined Litava and 26 villages and 6 customs from Peter and Leukus of the Dobrakutyai family because of their treachery according to a charter.

The village became deserted in the beginning of the 15th century. It became populated again only after Hussite struggles. The local population converted into Lutheran faith in the 16th century. The present Lutheran church was built between 1855 and 1859.

Genealogical resources

The records for genealogical research are available at the state archive "Statny Archiv in Banska Bystrica, Slovakia"

 Roman Catholic church records (births/marriages/deaths): 1850–1891 (parish B)
 Lutheran church records (births/marriages/deaths): 1735–1899 (parish A)

See also
 List of municipalities and towns in Slovakia

References

External links 
 
 
 About the old and new Litava Castle in Slovak
 About old Litava castle in Hungarian
 http://www.e-obce.sk/obec/cerovo/cerovo.html
 http://www.regionhont.sk/
Surnames of living people in Cerovo

Villages and municipalities in Krupina District
Castles in Slovakia